Cyclocheilichthys is a genus of ray-finned fish in the family Cyprinidae containing approximately eight valid species. They are native to freshwater habitats in Southeast Asia and China. Two additional species are alternately placed in the genus Anematichthys.

Species 
 Cyclocheilichthys apogon (Valenciennes, 1842) (Beardless Barb)
 Cyclocheilichthys enoplus (Bleeker, 1850)
 Cyclocheilichthys furcatus Sontirat, 1989
 Cyclocheilichthys heteronema (Bleeker, 1854)
 Cyclocheilichthys janthochir (Bleeker, 1854)
 Cyclocheilichthys lagleri Sontirat, 1989
 Cyclocheilichthys schoppeae Cervancia & Kottelat, 2007
 Cyclocheilichthys sinensis Bleeker, 1879

The species C. armatus and C. repasson are classified under Anematichthys by FishBase.

References 

 

 
Cyprinidae genera
Cyprinid fish of Asia